Aaliyah (1979–2001) was an American singer.

Aaliyah may also refer to:

Music
Aaliyah (album), the singer's self-titled 2001 album
"Aaliyah", a song by Katy B on the 2014 album Little Red
"Aaliyah", a song by Rapsody on the 2019 album Eve

Other uses
Aaliyah (given name)

See also
Aliyah, the immigration of Jews to Israel
Aliyah (disambiguation)
Aliya, a feminine given name of Arabic origin
Alia (disambiguation)